Wen Muye (born 14 February 1985) is a Chinese film director best known for his comedy-drama film Dying to Survive (2019).

Early life and education
Wen was born in Changchun, Jilin, on 14 February 1985. He attended Northeast Normal University, graduating in 2008. He went on to receive his master's degree from Beijing Film Academy in 2014 under the supervision of renowned film director Tian Zhuangzhuang.

Career
Wen rose to fame after directing Dying to Survive (2019), a comedy-drama film earned critical acclaim and received numerous awards and honors, such as Best Feature Film and Best New Director at the 55th Golden Horse Awards, Best Directorial Debut at the 32nd Golden Rooster Awards, Outstanding Film at the 35th Hundred Flowers Awards, and Best Director at the 26th Beijing College Student Film Festival.

Filmography

As director

Film and TV Awards

References

1985 births
People from Changchun
Living people
Northeast Normal University alumni
Beijing Film Academy alumni
Chinese film directors